The 1986 San Francisco State Gators football team represented San Francisco State University as a member of the Northern California Athletic Conference (NCAC) during the 1986 NCAA Division II football season. Led by 26th-year head coach Vic Rowen, San Francisco State finished the season with an overall record of 1–10 and a mark of 1–4 in conference play, placing fifth in the NCAC. For the season the team was outscored by its opponents 390 to 123. The Gators played home games at Cox Stadium in San Francisco.

After the season,  was forced to forfeit their 1986 victories due to the use of ineligible players. That included their November 1 victory over San Francisco State. The forfeit improved the Gators' overall record to 2–9.

Schedule

Team players in the NFL
No San Francisco State players were selected in the 1987 NFL Draft.

The following finished their college career in 1986, were not drafted, but played in the NFL.

References

San Francisco State
San Francisco State Gators football seasons
San Francisco State Gators football